Ryan Woods (born 16 May 1988) is an English footballer who plays for Carshalton Athletic.

Career

College and amateur
Woods attended Queen Elizabeth's Grammar School in Blackburn, and was part of the youth setup of English Premier League team Blackburn Rovers, for whom he started playing when he was just seven years old.

Woods moved to the United States in 2007 after accepting a scholarship to attend and play college soccer at Embry–Riddle Aeronautical University in Daytona Beach, Florida. He was a two-time all American at Embry Riddle, was his team's captain for three seasons, and as a Junior in 2009 he was a first team All-American, a first team Sun Conference All-Conference selection, and an Academic Sun Conference All-Conference honoree. He finished his college career with 23 goals and 19 assists in 55 career games.

During his college years Woods also played with Forest City London in the USL Premier Development League, scoring two goals in 16 games in the 2010 season.

Professional
Woods began his professional career in 2011 when he was signed by the NSC Minnesota Stars of the North American Soccer League after attending the team's preseason training camp. He made his professional debut on 30 April 2011, coming on as a substitute in a 1–1 draw with the Carolina RailHawks.

Return to England
He returned to England to work as a recruitment consultant in London and in January 2012 signed for Carshalton Athletic.

References

1988 births
Living people
English footballers
English expatriate footballers
FC London players
Minnesota United FC (2010–2016) players
USL League Two players
North American Soccer League players
Carshalton Athletic F.C. players
Expatriate soccer players in Canada
Expatriate soccer players in the United States
Association football midfielders
English expatriate sportspeople in the United States
English expatriate sportspeople in Canada